{{Infobox election
| election_name     = 1934 Hamilton municipal election
| flag_image        = Flag_of_Hamilton.svg
| country           = Canada
| type              = Presidential
| previous_election = 1933 Hamilton municipal election
| previous_year     = 1933
| next_election     = 1935 Hamilton municipal election
| next_year         = 1935
| election_date     = Monday, December 3, 1934

| image1            = 
| candidate1        = Herbert Wilton
| party1            = Independent (politician)
| popular_vote1     = 30,587
| percentage1       = 71.55%
| swing1            = +14.14%

| image2            = 
| candidate2        = Stuart Smith
| party2            = Independent (politician)
| popular_vote2     = 8,577
| percentage2       = 20.06%
| swing2            = n/a

| image3            = 
| candidate3        = John Hunter
| party3            = Communist
| popular_vote3     = 2,976
| percentage3       = 7%
| swing3            = n/a'

| image4            = 
| candidate4        = Thomas Fox
| party4            = Independent (politician)
| popular_vote4     = 428
| percentage4       = 1%
| swing4            = n/a| image5            = 
| candidate5        = John Cairney
| party5            = Independent (politician)
| popular_vote5     = 180
| percentage5       = 0.39%
| swing5            = n/a| map_image         = Wards of the City of Hamilton from 1931-1949.jpg
| map_size          = 300px
| map_caption       = Each of Hamilton's eight wards. Electors would send two Alderman per ward to City Hall in addition to four Controllers and one Mayor elected at-large.
| title             = Mayor
| before_election   = Herbert Wilton
| before_party      = Independent (politician)
| after_election    = Herbert Wilton
| after_party       = Independent (politician)
}}

The 1934 Hamilton municipal election was held on December 3, 1934, to select one Mayor, four Controllers, and sixteen members of the Hamilton, Ontario City Council, two from each of the city's eight wards. Voters also cast ballots for trustees for the public school board.

Campaign

Candidates needed to fulfill a number of requirements to stand for office, namely be:

An owner or tenant of a property in the city or within five miles of city-limits,
Entered on the last revised voter's list,
A British subject,
Not liable for arrears of taxes.

The election of 1934 was marked by the large number of mayoral candidates, with Herbert Wilton, who had considerable support from the local Conservative political machine, facing challenges from local barrister Stuart Smith, Communist candidate John Hunter, and minor candidates Thomas Fox and John Cairney. While Wilton maintained that he would continue his policy of classical liberal economic policy, Smith campaigned on a platform of reform, advertising that he would "correct the many existing evils by substituting the much needed reforms," and calling for Hamilton's own New Deal.

Having run successfully as a slate for two terms, members of the Economy Slate made no effort to continue their electoral cooperation. Citizens and associations in the city campaigned aggressively against slates, writing letters to the editor to the Spectator and issuing advertisements warning voters to "Beware of Slates.""Property Owners, Attention, Please! (Advertisement)," Hamilton Spectator, Saturday, December 1, 1934, pp. 19. Despite the negative public opinion regarding slates, the Spectator noted that members of the Conservative Party retained a majority of seats on council. The paper noted, "although it has never been a practice for either of the two old line parties to run slates, a check-up of next year's council representatives shows an overwhelming majority of members with Conservative leanings."

The city's branches of the CCF and ILP, who had cooperated in the election of 1933, had dissolved their electoral agreement. Strains caused by the election de facto slate leader Sam Lawrence's to the Ontario Legislature and ideological divisions between each party's local leadership were significant factors in the abandonment of the short-lived electoral cooperation. Both parties nominated candidates, in some occasions against candidates of the other party. Twelve CCF candidates and six ILP candidates contested the election, with only one member of each party being elected. Commenting on the election, the Spectator noted that only "Ward 8 along remains true to [the] divided party."

Also notable were the campaigns of official Liberal Party candidates in Wards 5 and 8. The party had normally avoided official involvement in municipal government, but nominated two candidates from a large pool of members who expressed interest in running. The Spectator reported that the candidates would "uphold Liberal principles in all municipal affairs."

Mayor

|-
!rowspan="2" colspan="2"|Candidate
!rowspan="2" colspan="1"|Affiliation
!colspan="3"|Popular vote
|-
! Votes
! %
! ±%
|-
| style="background-color:#1560BD;" |
| style="text-align:left;" | Herbert Wilton (incumbent)
| style="text-align:left;" | Independent
| style="text-align:right;" |30,587
| style="text-align:right;" |71.55%
| style="text-align:right;" |+14.14%
|-
| style="background-color:#AA98A9;" |
| style="text-align:left;" | Stuart Smith
| style="text-align:left;" | Independent
| style="text-align:right;" |8,577
| style="text-align:right;" |20.06%
| style="text-align:right;" |n/a|-
| style="background-color:#C41E3A;" |
| style="text-align:left;" | John Hunter
| style="text-align:left;" | Communist
| style="text-align:right;" |2,976
| style="text-align:right;" |7%
| style="text-align:right;" |n/a|-
| style="background-color:#ACACAC;" |
| style="text-align:left;" | Thomas Fox
| style="text-align:left;" | Independent
| style="text-align:right;" |428
| style="text-align:right;" |1%
| style="text-align:right;" |n/a|-
| style="background-color:#838996;" |
| style="text-align:left;" | John Cairney
| style="text-align:left;" | Independent
| style="text-align:right;" |180
| style="text-align:right;" |0.39%
| style="text-align:right;" |n/a|-
| style="text-align:right;background-color:#FFFFFF;" colspan="3" |Total votes
| style="text-align:right;background-color:#FFFFFF;" |42,748
| style="text-align:right;background-color:#FFFFFF;" |100%
| style="text-align:right;background-color:#FFFFFF;" |
|-
| style="text-align:right;background-color:#FFFFFF;" colspan="3" |Registered voters
| style="text-align:right;background-color:#FFFFFF;" |n/a
| style="text-align:right;background-color:#FFFFFF;" |n/a
| style="text-align:right;background-color:#FFFFFF;" |n/a
|-
| style="text-align:left;" colspan="6" |Note: Candidate campaign colours are used as a visual differentiation between candidates and to indicate affiliation.
|-
| style="text-align:left;" colspan="13" |Sources: "Figures show Wilton given wide support", Hamilton Spectator, Tuesday, December 4, 1934, pp. 15–22.
|}

Board of Control

|-
!rowspan="2" colspan="2"|Candidate
!rowspan="2" colspan="1"|Affiliation
!colspan="3"|Popular vote
|-
! Votes
! %
! ±%
|-
| style="background-color:#5D8AA8;" |
| style="text-align:left;" | Nora-Frances Henderson
| style="text-align:left;" | Women's Civic Club
| style="text-align:right;" |21,545
| style="text-align:right;" |n/a| style="text-align:right;" |n/a|-
| style="background-color:#FF91A4;" |
| style="text-align:left;" | Freeman Treleaven (incumbent)
| style="text-align:left;" | Independent
| style="text-align:right;" |19,154
| style="text-align:right;" |n/a| style="text-align:right;" |n/a|-
| style="background-color:#75B2DD;" |
| style="text-align:left;" | Donald MacFarlane (incumbent)
| style="text-align:left;" | Independent
| style="text-align:right;" |14,984
| style="text-align:right;" |n/a| style="text-align:right;" |n/a|-
| style="background-color:#75B2DD;" |
| style="text-align:left;" | Septimus DuMoulin (incumbent)
| style="text-align:left;" | Independent
| style="text-align:right;" |13,049
| style="text-align:right;" |n/a| style="text-align:right;" |n/a|-
| style="background-color:#FADA5E;" |
| style="text-align:left;" | John Mitchell
| style="text-align:left;" | CCF
| style="text-align:right;" |9,799
| style="text-align:right;" |n/a| style="text-align:right;" |n/a|-
| style="background-color:#708090;" |
| style="text-align:left;" | Andy Frame
| style="text-align:left;" | Independent
| style="text-align:right;" |9,236
| style="text-align:right;" |n/a| style="text-align:right;" |n/a|-
| style="background-color:#F3E5AB;" |
| style="text-align:left;" | Archie Pollock
| style="text-align:left;" | ILP
| style="text-align:right;" |8,798
| style="text-align:right;" |n/a| style="text-align:right;" |n/a|-
| style="background-color:#FADA5E;" |
| style="text-align:left;" | James Reed
| style="text-align:left;" | CCF
| style="text-align:right;" |8,441
| style="text-align:right;" |n/a| style="text-align:right;" |n/a|-
| style="background-color:#F3E5AB;" |
| style="text-align:left;" | Charles Aitchison
| style="text-align:left;" | ILP
| style="text-align:right;" |7,015
| style="text-align:right;" |n/a| style="text-align:right;" |n/a|-
| style="background-color:#808080;" |
| style="text-align:left;" | Wallace James
| style="text-align:left;" | Independent
| style="text-align:right;" |6,582
| style="text-align:right;" |n/a| style="text-align:right;" |n/a|-
| style="background-color:#C41E3A;" |
| style="text-align:left;" | David Arnott
| style="text-align:left;" | Communist Party
| style="text-align:right;" |2,370
| style="text-align:right;" |n/a| style="text-align:right;" |n/a|-
| style="background-color:#808080;" |
| style="text-align:left;" | John Brewer
| style="text-align:left;" | Independent
| style="text-align:right;" |449
| style="text-align:right;" |n/a| style="text-align:right;" |n/a|-
| style="text-align:right;background-color:#FFFFFF;" colspan="3" |Total votes
| style="text-align:right;background-color:#FFFFFF;" |n/a
| style="text-align:right;background-color:#FFFFFF;" |n/a
| style="text-align:right;background-color:#FFFFFF;" |
|-
| style="text-align:right;background-color:#FFFFFF;" colspan="3" |Registered voters
| style="text-align:right;background-color:#FFFFFF;" |n/a
| style="text-align:right;background-color:#FFFFFF;" |n/a
| style="text-align:right;background-color:#FFFFFF;" |n/a
|-
| style="text-align:left;" colspan="6" |Note: Candidate campaign colours are used as a visual differentiation between candidates and to indicate affiliation.
|-
| style="text-align:left;" colspan="13" |Sources: "Board of Control Summary", Hamilton Spectator, Tuesday, December 4, 1934, pp. 15.
|}

Aldermen

Ward One

|-
!rowspan="2" colspan="2"|Candidate
!rowspan="2" colspan="1"|Affiliation
!colspan="3"|Popular vote
|-
! Votes
! %
! ±%
|-
| style="background-color:#75B2DD;" |
| style="text-align:left;" | William MacFarland (incumbent)
| style="text-align:left;" | Independent
| style="text-align:right;" |4,632
| style="text-align:right;" |n/a| style="text-align:right;" |n/a|-
| style="background-color:#75B2DD;" |
| style="text-align:left;" | Orville Walsh
| style="text-align:left;" | Independent
| style="text-align:right;" |3,094
| style="text-align:right;" |n/a| style="text-align:right;" |n/a|-
| style="background-color:#5D8AA8;" |
| style="text-align:left;" | Elizabeth Bagshaw
| style="text-align:left;" | Women's Civic Club
| style="text-align:right;" |2,278
| style="text-align:right;" |n/a| style="text-align:right;" |n/a|-
| style="background-color:#FADA5E;" |
| style="text-align:left;" | Samuel Flint
| style="text-align:left;" | CCF
| style="text-align:right;" |619
| style="text-align:right;" |n/a| style="text-align:right;" |n/a|-
| style="background-color:#91A3B0;" |
| style="text-align:left;" | Robert Sutton
| style="text-align:left;" | Independent
| style="text-align:right;" |334
| style="text-align:right;" |n/a| style="text-align:right;" |n/a|-
| style="text-align:right;background-color:#FFFFFF;" colspan="3" |Total votes
| style="text-align:right;background-color:#FFFFFF;" |n/a
| style="text-align:right;background-color:#FFFFFF;" |n/a
| style="text-align:right;background-color:#FFFFFF;" |
|-
| style="text-align:right;background-color:#FFFFFF;" colspan="3" |Registered voters
| style="text-align:right;background-color:#FFFFFF;" |n/a
| style="text-align:right;background-color:#FFFFFF;" |n/a
| style="text-align:right;background-color:#FFFFFF;" |n/a
|-
| style="text-align:left;" colspan="6" |Note: Candidate campaign colours are used as a visual differentiation between candidates and to indicate affiliation.
|-
| style="text-align:left;" colspan="13" |Sources: "How Aldermanic Candidates Ran", Hamilton Spectator, Tuesday, December 4, 1934, pp. 15.
|}

Ward Two

|-
!rowspan="2" colspan="2"|Candidate
!rowspan="2" colspan="1"|Affiliation
!colspan="3"|Popular vote
|-
! Votes
! %
! ±%
|-
| style="background-color:#75B2DD;" |
| style="text-align:left;" | Franklin Turville
| style="text-align:left;" | Independent
| style="text-align:right;" |2,752
| style="text-align:right;" |n/a| style="text-align:right;" |n/a|-
| style="background-color:#FF91A4;" |
| style="text-align:left;" | William Ainsley (incumbent)
| style="text-align:left;" | Independent
| style="text-align:right;" |2,411
| style="text-align:right;" |n/a| style="text-align:right;" |n/a|-
| style="background-color:#ACACAC;" |
| style="text-align:left;" | Lorne Gatenby
| style="text-align:left;" | Independent
| style="text-align:right;" |1,520
| style="text-align:right;" |n/a| style="text-align:right;" |n/a|-
| style="text-align:right;background-color:#FFFFFF;" colspan="3" |Total votes
| style="text-align:right;background-color:#FFFFFF;" |n/a
| style="text-align:right;background-color:#FFFFFF;" |n/a
| style="text-align:right;background-color:#FFFFFF;" |
|-
| style="text-align:right;background-color:#FFFFFF;" colspan="3" |Registered voters
| style="text-align:right;background-color:#FFFFFF;" |n/a
| style="text-align:right;background-color:#FFFFFF;" |n/a
| style="text-align:right;background-color:#FFFFFF;" |n/a
|-
| style="text-align:left;" colspan="6" |Note: Candidate campaign colours are used as a visual differentiation between candidates and to indicate affiliation.
|-
| style="text-align:left;" colspan="13" |Sources: "How Aldermanic Candidates Ran", Hamilton Spectator, Tuesday, December 4, 1934, pp. 15.
|}

Ward Three

|-
!rowspan="2" colspan="2"|Candidate
!rowspan="2" colspan="1"|Affiliation
!colspan="3"|Popular vote
|-
! Votes
! %
! ±%
|-
| style="background-color:#75B2DD;" |
| style="text-align:left;" | Robert Evans (incumbent)
| style="text-align:left;" | Independent
| style="text-align:right;" |2,412
| style="text-align:right;" |n/a| style="text-align:right;" |n/a|-
| style="background-color:#75B2DD;" |
| style="text-align:left;" | William Fick (incumbent)
| style="text-align:left;" | Independent
| style="text-align:right;" |2,069
| style="text-align:right;" |n/a| style="text-align:right;" |n/a|-
| style="background-color:#3EB489;" |
| style="text-align:left;" | Austin Macaulay
| style="text-align:left;" | Independent
| style="text-align:right;" |1,443
| style="text-align:right;" |n/a| style="text-align:right;" |n/a|-
| style="background-color:#ACACAC;" |
| style="text-align:left;" | D'Arcy Lee
| style="text-align:left;" | Independent
| style="text-align:right;" |1,230
| style="text-align:right;" |n/a| style="text-align:right;" |n/a|-
| style="background-color:#FADA5E;" |
| style="text-align:left;" | Arthur Patrick
| style="text-align:left;" | CCF
| style="text-align:right;" |992
| style="text-align:right;" |n/a| style="text-align:right;" |n/a|-
| style="background-color:#BFC1C2;" |
| style="text-align:left;" | George Dunsmure
| style="text-align:left;" | Independent
| style="text-align:right;" |503
| style="text-align:right;" |n/a| style="text-align:right;" |n/a|-
| style="text-align:right;background-color:#FFFFFF;" colspan="3" |Total votes
| style="text-align:right;background-color:#FFFFFF;" |n/a
| style="text-align:right;background-color:#FFFFFF;" |n/a
| style="text-align:right;background-color:#FFFFFF;" |
|-
| style="text-align:right;background-color:#FFFFFF;" colspan="3" |Registered voters
| style="text-align:right;background-color:#FFFFFF;" |n/a
| style="text-align:right;background-color:#FFFFFF;" |n/a
| style="text-align:right;background-color:#FFFFFF;" |n/a
|-
| style="text-align:left;" colspan="6" |Note: Candidate campaign colours are used as a visual differentiation between candidates and to indicate affiliation.
|-
| style="text-align:left;" colspan="13" |Sources: "How Aldermanic Candidates Ran", Hamilton Spectator, Tuesday, December 4, 1934, pp. 15.
|}

Ward Four

|-
!rowspan="2" colspan="2"|Candidate
!rowspan="2" colspan="1"|Affiliation
!colspan="3"|Popular vote
|-
! Votes
! %
! ±%
|-
| style="background-color:#75B2DD;" |
| style="text-align:left;" | George Hancock (incumbent)
| style="text-align:left;" | Independent
| style="text-align:right;" |1,829
| style="text-align:right;" |n/a| style="text-align:right;" |n/a|-
| style="background-color:#75B2DD;" |
| style="text-align:left;" | Arthur Davidson (incumbent)
| style="text-align:left;" | Independent
| style="text-align:right;" |1,707
| style="text-align:right;" |n/a| style="text-align:right;" |n/a|-
| style="background-color:#BFC1C2;" |
| style="text-align:left;" | William Thompson
| style="text-align:left;" | Independent
| style="text-align:right;" |1,207
| style="text-align:right;" |n/a| style="text-align:right;" |n/a|-
| style="background-color:#FF91A4;" |
| style="text-align:left;" | Peter McCulloch
| style="text-align:left;" | Independent
| style="text-align:right;" |1,032
| style="text-align:right;" |n/a| style="text-align:right;" |n/a|-
| style="background-color:#F3E5AB;" |
| style="text-align:left;" | Charles Pollicott
| style="text-align:left;" | ILP
| style="text-align:right;" |849
| style="text-align:right;" |n/a| style="text-align:right;" |n/a|-
| style="background-color:#FADA5E;" |
| style="text-align:left;" | James Newell
| style="text-align:left;" | CCF
| style="text-align:right;" |433
| style="text-align:right;" |n/a| style="text-align:right;" |n/a|-
| style="text-align:right;background-color:#FFFFFF;" colspan="3" |Total votes
| style="text-align:right;background-color:#FFFFFF;" |n/a
| style="text-align:right;background-color:#FFFFFF;" |n/a
| style="text-align:right;background-color:#FFFFFF;" |
|- 
| style="text-align:right;background-color:#FFFFFF;" colspan="3" |Registered voters
| style="text-align:right;background-color:#FFFFFF;" |n/a
| style="text-align:right;background-color:#FFFFFF;" |n/a
| style="text-align:right;background-color:#FFFFFF;" |n/a
|- 
| style="text-align:left;" colspan="6" |Note: Candidate campaign colours are used as a visual differentiation between candidates and to indicate affiliation.
|- 
| style="text-align:left;" colspan="13" |Sources: "How Aldermanic Candidates Ran", Hamilton Spectator, Tuesday, December 4, 1934, pp. 15.
|}

Ward Five

|-
!rowspan="2" colspan="2"|Candidate
!rowspan="2" colspan="1"|Affiliation
!colspan="3"|Popular vote
|-
! Votes
! %
! ±%
|-
| style="background-color:#75B2DD;" |
| style="text-align:left;" | Thomas White (incumbent)
| style="text-align:left;" | Independent
| style="text-align:right;" |2,581
| style="text-align:right;" |n/a| style="text-align:right;" |n/a|-
| style="background-color:#75B2DD;" |
| style="text-align:left;" | Alexander Nelligan
| style="text-align:left;" | Independent
| style="text-align:right;" |1,967
| style="text-align:right;" |n/a| style="text-align:right;" |n/a|-
| style="background-color:" |
| style="text-align:left;" | Albert Marck
| style="text-align:left;" | Liberal
| style="text-align:right;" |1,223
| style="text-align:right;" |n/a| style="text-align:right;" |n/a|-
| style="background-color:#FADA5E;" |
| style="text-align:left;" | John Rae
| style="text-align:left;" | CCF
| style="text-align:right;" |678
| style="text-align:right;" |n/a| style="text-align:right;" |n/a|-
| style="background-color:#B2BEB5;" |
| style="text-align:left;" | Christopher Hennessy
| style="text-align:left;" | Independent
| style="text-align:right;" |372
| style="text-align:right;" |n/a| style="text-align:right;" |n/a|-
| style="background-color:#BFC1C2;" |
| style="text-align:left;" | Michael Hutchison
| style="text-align:left;" | Independent
| style="text-align:right;" |317
| style="text-align:right;" |n/a| style="text-align:right;" |n/a|-
| style="text-align:right;background-color:#FFFFFF;" colspan="3" |Total votes
| style="text-align:right;background-color:#FFFFFF;" |n/a
| style="text-align:right;background-color:#FFFFFF;" |n/a
| style="text-align:right;background-color:#FFFFFF;" |
|-
| style="text-align:right;background-color:#FFFFFF;" colspan="3" |Registered voters
| style="text-align:right;background-color:#FFFFFF;" |n/a
| style="text-align:right;background-color:#FFFFFF;" |n/a
| style="text-align:right;background-color:#FFFFFF;" |n/a
|-
| style="text-align:left;" colspan="6" |Note: Candidate campaign colours are used as a visual differentiation between candidates and to indicate affiliation.
|-
| style="text-align:left;" colspan="13" |Sources: "How Aldermanic Candidates Ran", Hamilton Spectator, Tuesday, December 4, 1934, pp. 15.
|}

Ward Six

|-
!rowspan="2" colspan="2"|Candidate
!rowspan="2" colspan="1"|Affiliation
!colspan="3"|Popular vote
|-
! Votes
! %
! ±%
|-
| style="background-color:#91A3B0;" |
| style="text-align:left;" | William Weir
| style="text-align:left;" | Independent
| style="text-align:right;" |1,986
| style="text-align:right;" |n/a| style="text-align:right;" |n/a|-
| style="background-color:#FF91A4;" |
| style="text-align:left;" | John Hodgson
| style="text-align:left;" | Independent
| style="text-align:right;" |1,867
| style="text-align:right;" |n/a| style="text-align:right;" |n/a|-
| style="background-color:#BFC1C2;" |
| style="text-align:left;" | William Snyder
| style="text-align:left;" | Independent
| style="text-align:right;" |1,325
| style="text-align:right;" |n/a| style="text-align:right;" |n/a|-
| style="background-color:#B0E0E6;" |
| style="text-align:left;" | James Morris
| style="text-align:left;" | Independent
| style="text-align:right;" |1,014
| style="text-align:right;" |n/a| style="text-align:right;" |n/a|-
| style="background-color:#FADA5E;" |
| style="text-align:left;" | Frank Thompson
| style="text-align:left;" | CCF
| style="text-align:right;" |937
| style="text-align:right;" |n/a| style="text-align:right;" |n/a|-
| style="background-color:#BFC1C2;" |
| style="text-align:left;" | John Sherring
| style="text-align:left;" | Independent
| style="text-align:right;" |856
| style="text-align:right;" |n/a| style="text-align:right;" |n/a|-
| style="background-color:#BFC1C2;" |
| style="text-align:left;" | Thomas Barnes
| style="text-align:left;" | Independent
| style="text-align:right;" |650
| style="text-align:right;" |n/a| style="text-align:right;" |n/a|-
| style="background-color:#FADA5E;" |
| style="text-align:left;" | Harold Harrison
| style="text-align:left;" | CCF
| style="text-align:right;" |628
| style="text-align:right;" |n/a| style="text-align:right;" |n/a|-
| style="background-color:#BFC1C2;" |
| style="text-align:left;" | John Wise
| style="text-align:left;" | Independent
| style="text-align:right;" |599
| style="text-align:right;" |n/a| style="text-align:right;" |n/a|-
| style="background-color:#BFC1C2;" |
| style="text-align:left;" | James Johnson
| style="text-align:left;" | Independent
| style="text-align:right;" |359
| style="text-align:right;" |n/a| style="text-align:right;" |n/a|-
| style="background-color:#F3E5AB;" |
| style="text-align:left;" | William Wardley
| style="text-align:left;" | ILP
| style="text-align:right;" |297
| style="text-align:right;" |n/a| style="text-align:right;" |n/a|-
| style="background-color:#BFC1C2;" |
| style="text-align:left;" | Charles Servos
| style="text-align:left;" | Independent
| style="text-align:right;" |286
| style="text-align:right;" |n/a| style="text-align:right;" |n/a|-
| style="background-color:#BFC1C2;" |
| style="text-align:left;" |Harvey Hunt
| style="text-align:left;" | Independent
| style="text-align:right;" |188
| style="text-align:right;" |n/a| style="text-align:right;" |n/a|-
| style="background-color:#BFC1C2;" |
| style="text-align:left;" | Edward Langley
| style="text-align:left;" | Independent
| style="text-align:right;" |93
| style="text-align:right;" |n/a| style="text-align:right;" |n/a|-
| style="text-align:right;background-color:#FFFFFF;" colspan="3" |Total votes
| style="text-align:right;background-color:#FFFFFF;" |n/a
| style="text-align:right;background-color:#FFFFFF;" |n/a
| style="text-align:right;background-color:#FFFFFF;" |
|-
| style="text-align:right;background-color:#FFFFFF;" colspan="3" |Registered voters
| style="text-align:right;background-color:#FFFFFF;" |n/a
| style="text-align:right;background-color:#FFFFFF;" |n/a
| style="text-align:right;background-color:#FFFFFF;" |n/a
|-
| style="text-align:left;" colspan="6" |Note: Candidate campaign colours are used as a visual differentiation between candidates and to indicate affiliation.
|-
| style="text-align:left;" colspan="13" |Sources: "How Aldermanic Candidates Ran", Hamilton Spectator, Tuesday, December 4, 1934, pp. 15.
|}

Ward Seven

|-
!rowspan="2" colspan="2"|Candidate
!rowspan="2" colspan="1"|Affiliation
!colspan="3"|Popular vote
|-
! Votes
! %
! ±%
|-
| style="background-color:#75B2DD;" |
| style="text-align:left;" | Thomas Lewington (incumbent)
| style="text-align:left;" | Independent
| style="text-align:right;" |2,332
| style="text-align:right;" |n/a| style="text-align:right;" |n/a|-
| style="background-color:#75B2DD;" |
| style="text-align:left;" | Archie Burton
| style="text-align:left;" | Independent
| style="text-align:right;" |1,608
| style="text-align:right;" |n/a| style="text-align:right;" |n/a|-
| style="background-color:#F3E5AB;" |
| style="text-align:left;" | Samuel Clarke (incumbent)
| style="text-align:left;" | ILP
| style="text-align:right;" |1,567
| style="text-align:right;" |n/a| style="text-align:right;" |n/a|-
| style="background-color:#FADA5E;" |
| style="text-align:left;" | William Clark
| style="text-align:left;" | CCF
| style="text-align:right;" |1,183
| style="text-align:right;" |n/a| style="text-align:right;" |n/a|-
| style="background-color:#FADA5E;" |
| style="text-align:left;" | Joseph Morris
| style="text-align:left;" | CCF
| style="text-align:right;" |929
| style="text-align:right;" |n/a| style="text-align:right;" |n/a|-
| style="text-align:right;background-color:#FFFFFF;" colspan="3" |Total votes
| style="text-align:right;background-color:#FFFFFF;" |n/a
| style="text-align:right;background-color:#FFFFFF;" |n/a
| style="text-align:right;background-color:#FFFFFF;" |
|-
| style="text-align:right;background-color:#FFFFFF;" colspan="3" |Registered voters
| style="text-align:right;background-color:#FFFFFF;" |n/a
| style="text-align:right;background-color:#FFFFFF;" |n/a
| style="text-align:right;background-color:#FFFFFF;" |n/a
|-
| style="text-align:left;" colspan="6" |Note: Candidate campaign colours are used as a visual differentiation between candidates and to indicate affiliation.
|-
| style="text-align:left;" colspan="13" |Sources: "How Aldermanic Candidates Ran", Hamilton Spectator, Tuesday, December 4, 1934, pp. 15.
|}

Ward Eight

|-
!rowspan="2" colspan="2"|Candidate
!rowspan="2" colspan="1"|Affiliation
!colspan="3"|Popular vote
|-
! Votes
! %
! ±%
|-
| style="background-color:#FADA5E;" |
| style="text-align:left;" | Agnes Sharpe
| style="text-align:left;" | CCF
| style="text-align:right;" |3,042
| style="text-align:right;" |n/a| style="text-align:right;" |n/a|-
| style="background-color:#F3E5AB;" |
| style="text-align:left;" | William Harrison
| style="text-align:left;" | ILP
| style="text-align:right;" |1,810
| style="text-align:right;" |n/a| style="text-align:right;" |n/a|-
| style="background-color:#FADA5E;" |
| style="text-align:left;" | Roy Aindow
| style="text-align:left;" | CCF
| style="text-align:right;" |1,319
| style="text-align:right;" |n/a| style="text-align:right;" |n/a|-
| style="background-color:#75B2DD;" |
| style="text-align:left;" | Robert Elliot
| style="text-align:left;" | Independent
| style="text-align:right;" |1,238
| style="text-align:right;" |n/a| style="text-align:right;" |n/a|-
| style="background-color:" |
| style="text-align:left;" | William Hale
| style="text-align:left;" | Liberal
| style="text-align:right;" |979
| style="text-align:right;" |n/a| style="text-align:right;" |n/a|-
| style="background-color:#ACACAC;" |
| style="text-align:left;" | Frank Stockdale
| style="text-align:left;" | Independent
| style="text-align:right;" |337
| style="text-align:right;" |n/a| style="text-align:right;" |n/a|-
| style="background-color:#ACACAC;" |
| style="text-align:left;" | George Knowles
| style="text-align:left;" | Independent
| style="text-align:right;" |272
| style="text-align:right;" |n/a| style="text-align:right;" |n/a''
|-
| style="text-align:right;background-color:#FFFFFF;" colspan="3" |Total votes
| style="text-align:right;background-color:#FFFFFF;" |n/a
| style="text-align:right;background-color:#FFFFFF;" |n/a
| style="text-align:right;background-color:#FFFFFF;" |
|-
| style="text-align:right;background-color:#FFFFFF;" colspan="3" |Registered voters
| style="text-align:right;background-color:#FFFFFF;" |n/a
| style="text-align:right;background-color:#FFFFFF;" |n/a
| style="text-align:right;background-color:#FFFFFF;" |n/a
|-
| style="text-align:left;" colspan="6" |Note: Candidate campaign colours are used as a visual differentiation between candidates and to indicate affiliation.
|-
| style="text-align:left;" colspan="13" |Sources: "How Aldermanic Candidates Ran", Hamilton Spectator, Tuesday, December 4, 1934, pp. 15.
|}

References

1934 Ontario municipal elections
1934